Dvārakā, also known as Dvāravatī (Sanskrit द्वारका "the gated [city]", possibly meaning having many gates, or alternatively having one or several very grand gates), is a sacred historic city in the sacred literature of Hinduism, Jainism, and Buddhism. It is also alternatively spelled as Dvarika. The name Dvaraka is said to have been given to the place by Krishna, a major deity in Hinduism. Dvaraka is one of the Sapta Puri (seven sacred cities) of Hinduism.

In the Mahabharata, it was a city located in what is now Dwarka, formerly called Kushasthali, the fort of which had to be repaired by the Yadavas. In this epic, the city is described as a capital of the Anarta Kingdom. According to the Harivamsa the city was located in the region of the Sindhu Kingdom.

In the Hindu epics and the Puranas, Dvaraka is called Dvaravati and is one of seven Tirtha (pilgrimage) sites for spiritual liberation. The other six are Mathura, Ayodhya, Kashi, Kanchipuram, Avantika (Ujjain) and Puri.

Description in the Harivamsa 
In Harivamsa, Dvaraka is described as largely built on "submerged land", "released by the ocean" (2.55.118 and 2.58.34).
 The city was the former "sporting ground of the King Raivataka" called "Dvāravāti", which "was squared like a chess board" (2.56.29).
 Nearby was the mountain range Raivataka (2.56.27), "the living place of the gods" (2.55.111).
 The city was measured by Brahmins; the foundations of the houses were laid and at least some of the houses were built by the Yadavas (2.58.9 - 15).
 It was built by Vishwakarman in one day (2.58.40) "mentally" (2.58.41 and 44).
 It had surrounding walls (2.58.48 and 53) with four main gates (2.58.16).
 Its houses were arranged in lines (2.58.41) and the city had "high buildings" (2.58.50 and 54) (2.58.53), which "almost touched the sky" (2.58.50), and had "doors that had the colour of white clouds" (2.58.48).
 The fort walls of the city were "shining with the colour of the Sun and pots of gold" and "sounds emanating from grand houses sparkling with golden colour" (2.58.53).
 It had a temple area with a palace for Krishna himself, which had a separate bathroom (2.58.43).
 "The city is beautified on Earth by the ocean" like Indra's heavenly city is "beautified by an assembly of important jewels" (2.58.47 - 66, (2.58.49).

Dvaraka in Hindu scripture

Description 

The following description of Dvaraka during Krishna's presence there appears in the Bhagavata Purana (Srimad-Bhagavatam; 10.69.1-12) in connection with the sage Narada's visit.

The City was filled with the sounds of birds and bees flying about the parks and pleasure gardens, while its lakes, crowded with blooming indivara, ambhoja, kahlara, kumuda, and utpala lotuses, resounded with the calls of swans and cranes.

Dvaraka boasted 900,000 royal palaces, all constructed with crystal and silver and splendorously decorated with huge emeralds. Inside these palaces, the furnishings were bedecked with gold and jewels.

Traffic moved along a well laid-out system of boulevards, roads, intersections, and marketplaces, and many assembly houses and temples of demigods graced the charming city. The roads, courtyards, commercial streets, and residential patios were all sprinkled with water and shaded from the sun's heat by banners waving from flagpoles.

In the city of Dvaraka was a beautiful private quarter worshiped by the planetary rulers. This district, where the demigod Vishvakarma had shown all his divine skill, was the residential area of Lord Hari Krishna, and thus it was gorgeously decorated by the sixteen thousand palaces of Lord Krishna's queens. Narada Muni entered one of these immense palaces.

Supporting the palace were coral pillars decoratively inlaid with vaidurya gems. Sapphires bedecked the walls, and the floors glowed with perpetual brilliance. In that palace Tvashta had arranged canopies with hanging strands of pearls; there were also seats and beds fashioned of ivory and precious jewels. In attendance were many well-dressed maidservants bearing lockets on their necks, and also armor-clad guards with turbans, fine uniforms, and jeweled earrings.

The glow of numerous jewel-studded lamps dispelled all darkness in the palace. My dear king, on the ornate ridges of the roof danced loudly crying peacocks, who saw the fragrant aguru incense escaping through the holes of the latticed windows and mistook it for a cloud.

Events 
 Pandu's sons lived in Dwaraka during their exile to woods. Their servants headed by Indrasena lived there for one year (the 13th year) (4,72).
 Bala Rama mentioned about a sacrificial fire of Dwaraka, before he set for his pilgrimage over Sarasvati River (9,35).
 One should proceed with subdued senses and regulated diet to Dwaravati, where by bathing in "the holy place called Pindaraka", one obtaineth the fruit of the gift of gold in abundance (3,82).
 King Nriga, in consequence of a single fault of his, had to dwell for a long time at Dwaravati, and Krishna became the cause of his rescue from that miserable plight.(13,72).
 Sage Durvasa resided at Dwaravati for a long time (13,160).
 Arjuna visited Dwaravati during his military campaign after the Kurukshetra War (14,83).
 When the Pandavas retire from the world they visit the place where Dvaraka once used to be and see the city submerged under water.

Related archaeology

During 1983-1990, the Marine Archaeology Unit of India's National Institute of Oceanography (NIO) carried out underwater excavations at Dwarka and Bet Dwarka. According to S. R. Rao "The available archaeological evidence from onshore and offshore excavations confirms the existence of a city-state with a couple of satellite towns in 1500 B.C." He considered it reasonable to conclude that this submerged city is the Dvaraka as described in the Mahabharata.

Submergence 

In the Mausala Parva of the Mahabharata, Arjuna witnesses the submergence of Dvaraka and describes it as follows:

See also 
 Marine archaeology in the Gulf of Cambay
 Dvaravati sila
 Dvārakā–Kamboja route
 List of lost lands

References

Bibliography
 
 Gaur, A.S., Sundaresh, P. Gudigar, Sila Tripati, K.H. Vora and S.N. Bandodkar (2000) Recent underwater explorations at Dwarka and surroundings of Okha Mandal, Man and Environment, XXV(1): 67-74.
 Gaur, A.S. and Sundaresh (2003) Onshore Excavation at Bet Dwarka Island, in the Gulf of Kachchh, Gujarat, Man and Environment, XXVIII(1): 57-66.

Further reading
 

Yadava kingdoms
History of Gujarat
Hindu holy cities
Submerged places
Dwarka